Eugenio Saller (5 June 1928 – April 2017) was a Brazilian tennis player. He competed at Wimbledon and French Open in 1952, but was eliminated in the first round.

References

External links
 

Brazilian male tennis players
1928 births
2017 deaths